Pennsylvania Barge Club is an amateur rowing club, situated along the historic Boathouse Row of Philadelphia, Pennsylvania.  It was founded in 1861 and joined the Schuylkill Navy in 1865. The club's boathouse, at #4 Boathouse Row, is also known as the Hollenback House, named for William M. Hollenback, Jr., who served as President of USRowing from 1979 until 1985.

Painter Thomas Eakins was most likely a longtime member of Pennsylvania Barge Club. His friend, Max Schmitt, rowed for the club, and won the single sculls championship 6 times.

In Schuylkill Navy races, Pennsylvania Barge had 359 entries and 106 victories. Its teams represented the United States in the 1920 (four-with-cox), 1924 (four-with), 1928 (four-with and four-without), and 1932 (pair-with) Olympic Games.

As a result of World War II, the club suffered a drastic reduction in membership. In 1955, the Club turned its boathouse over to the Schuylkill Navy. Thereafter, the Pennsylvania Barge Club served as an administrative center for rowing, including serving as Headquarters for the National Association of Amateur Oarsmen, which later became USRowing. The building also housed the Schuylkill Navy, the United States rowing Society (formerly Schuylkill Navy Association), the Philadelphia Scholastic Rowing Association, the Middle States Regatta Association, and the Dad Vail Rowing Association.

In 2009, the club was reactivated and reinstated as a member of the Schuylkill Navy.

History of the boathouse
In 1868, the club received permission from the Fairmount Park Commission to build a replacement for its brick house. Between 1869 and 1871, the Club erected a boathouse with Crescent Boat Club.
In 1892, Pennsylvania Barge Club replaced their half of the double boathouse. Architect, Luis Hickman, designed Pennsylvania Barge Club's boathouse in the picturesque Victorian style.
Hickman was a member of the T-Square Club and known for his renovation of Merchants' Exchange Building. In 1912, the Club hired C.E. Schermerhorn to add second floor of timber and stucco.

Photo gallery

See also

Max Schmitt in a Single Scull

References

Further reading

External links
 Pennsylvania Barge Club on wikimapia.org

National Register of Historic Places in Philadelphia
National Historic Landmarks in Pennsylvania
Buildings and structures in Philadelphia
Cultural infrastructure completed in 1892
Tudor Revival architecture in Pennsylvania
Boathouse Row
Schuylkill Navy
Sports clubs established in 1861
1861 establishments in Pennsylvania
Philadelphia Register of Historic Places
Historic district contributing properties in Pennsylvania
Boathouses on the National Register of Historic Places in Pennsylvania